Tim J. Dillon is an American comedian, podcaster, and actor. He is host of the Tim Dillon Show podcast.

Early life
Dillon was born in Island Park, New York, and grew up there. He is of Irish Catholic descent. His parents divorced when he was young. As a result he was mostly raised by his mother, who he said was eventually diagnosed with schizophrenia.

As a child in 1994, he landed a small role on the PBS children's show Sesame Street. Dillon said on The Joe Rogan Experience, "I was a child actor as a kid and I failed. I was on Sesame Street twice. I did the polka with Snuffleupagus."

Career
Before becoming a comedian, Dillon worked as an office printer salesman and a mortgage broker during the subprime mortgage crisis. When the market crashed, he became a New York City tour guide. He entered the stand-up scene around 2010. After a 2016 appearance at the Just for Laughs comedy festival in Montreal, Rolling Stone named Dillon as one of the "10 Comedians You Need to Know" in 2017. 
Along with Luis J. Gomez and Nick Mullen, Dillon was also a co-host of the Real Ass Podcast spin-off podcast Bastard Radio in 2020.

Vulture described Dillon in 2016 as "simultaneously a boisterous, conservative-leaning Long Island native and a thoughtful, homosexual foodie with a soft spot for frozen yogurt". Rolling Stone in 2017 described him as "capable of formulating an articulate (and often contrarian) opinion about anything at a moment's notice".

In August 2022, Dillon released his first standup special: Tim Dillon: A Real Hero.

The Tim Dillon Show podcast 

The Tim Dillon Show is a comedic video podcast hosted by Dillon that discusses events from his life and news topics that often revolve around American cultural issues, the entertainment industry, and politics. Dillon also releases additional audio content to his Patreon supporters. As of June 2022, with over 42,658 paying subscribers and making over $221,000 per month, his podcast is one of the most popular on the platform.

The Tim Dillon Show was originally named Tim Dillon Is Going to Hell, when the podcast was first launched on the GaS Digital Network and featured co-host and fellow Long Island-based comedian Ray Kump. Dillon would leave GaS Digital, adding producer and friend Ben Avery, off whom Dillon often bounced questions and ideas. In September 2022, Avery parted ways with Dillon and the show — as of November 2022, Avery works with comedian Kyle Dunnigan.

Personal life
As of March 2021, he resides in Los Angeles, after briefly living in Austin, Texas.

Dillon is gay and came out at the age of 25.

He struggled with substance abuse in his past. According to Dillon, he started using drugs and alcohol at the age of 13, and had become a cocaine addict by 18. He has been sober for several years.

He is also a real estate investor, owning a home in Austin, Texas, and a $4 million estate in the Hamptons, New York. However, he has since released a response on his YouTube channel contesting the alleged value of the deal, claiming that it was in fact around $2.4 million.

Politics
Dillon said in 2016, "I'm politically all over the map, though I lean conservative", and "I don't think politically I line up with anything. I think it's all fake." He said he did not vote in the 2020 US general election, disapproving of both Donald Trump and Joe Biden. In 2016, Dillon praised Bernie Sanders, saying, "I think people should have health care, and I know a lot of people are angry at me about that."

Filmography

Film

Television

References

External links
 
 

Living people
21st-century American male actors
21st-century American comedians
21st-century American male writers
American gay actors
American male comedians
American people of Irish descent
American podcasters
American sketch comedians
American stand-up comedians
Gay comedians
LGBT people from New York (state)
Nassau Community College alumni
People from Long Island
People from Houston
Patreon creators
Year of birth missing (living people)
American LGBT comedians